Taeniotes batesi is a species of beetle in the family Cerambycidae. It was described by James Thomson in 1879. It is known from Colombia.

References

batesi
Beetles described in 1879